KJIL is a Christian radio station broadcasting on 99.1 FM, licensed to Copeland, Kansas and serving the areas of Dodge City, Kansas, Garden City, Kansas, and Liberal, Kansas. The station is owned by Great Plains Christian Radio.

The station's format consists primarily of Christian adult contemporary music, with a few Christian talk and teaching programs.

History
KJIL began broadcasting September 5, 1992. The station's first translator began broadcasting in 1994. In December 1999, 90.7 KJOV in Woodward, Oklahoma began simulcasting KJIL. Great Plains Christian Radio purchased the station for $60,000 the following year.

In 2001, Great Plains Christian Radio acquired country music formatted KDMM-FM 105.7 in Herington, Kansas, and the station adopted a Christian adult contemporary format, with its call sign being changed to KJRL.

Translators
KJIL is also heard on translators throughout Kansas, Oklahoma, Texas, and Colorado, as well as on full power stations KJRL 105.7 in Herington, Kansas, KJLG 91.9 in Emporia, Kansas, KJVL 88.1 in Hutchinson, Kansas, KJLJ 88.5 in Scott City, Kansas, KNGM 88.9 in Guymon, Oklahoma, KJOV 90.7 in Woodward, Oklahoma, and KJHL 90.9 in Boise City, Oklahoma.

Kansas

Oklahoma

Texas

Colorado

References

External links 
KJIL's website

Contemporary Christian radio stations in the United States
Radio stations established in 1992
1992 establishments in Kansas
JIL